Osceola is a former logging community in eastern Randolph County, West Virginia, USA. It was located within what is now the Monongahela National Forest on Gandy Creek at the southern extremity of Little Middle Mountain and Yokum Knob.

The community was named after Osceola, a Seminole chief.

During the period 1900 to 1915, Osceola was a sizable lumbering town of several hundred loggers, timbermen, sawmill operators and saloonkeepers who made the most of the then booming timber industry. Today, virtually no trace of the former settlement is evident. A few scattered hunting camps and farmhouses occupy the area.

Osceola was very near the celebrated Sinks of Gandy Creek and modern maps as often designate the place as “The Sinks”.

References

Unincorporated communities in Randolph County, West Virginia
Unincorporated communities in West Virginia
Logging communities in the United States